Brumley may refer to:

Brumley, Missouri, a village in Miller County, Missouri, United States
Brumley, a fictitious town in England where English dramatist J. B. Priestley's play An Inspector Calls is set
Albert E. Brumley (1905–1977), American Gospel singer and composer
George Brumley, Jr. (1934/5–2003), American physician and academic
Mike Brumley (catcher) (1938–2016), American baseball player
Mike Brumley (infielder) (born 1963), American baseball player

See also 
Burnley, England
Burnley (disambiguation)